A Croydon is a type of horse-drawn two-wheeled carriage. The first examples were seen around 1850 and were made of wicker-work, but they were later made of wood.

See also 
 Types of carriages

References
Brewer's Britain and Ireland, compiled by John Ayto and Ian Crofton, Weidenfeld & Nicolson, 2005, 

Carriages
Horse driving
Animal-powered vehicles